Albertas Šimėnas (born 17 February 1950) was Prime Minister of Lithuania for 3 days, from 10 to 13 January 1991. He disappeared during the January Events and was replaced by Gediminas Vagnorius.

Šimėnas graduated from the Vilnius University in 1972 with a degree in economics. He lectured at the Vilnius Gediminas Technical University from 1984 to 1989. He joined activities of Sąjūdis movement and was elected to the Supreme Council – Reconstituent Seimas. On 11 March 1990 he signed the Act of the Re-Establishment of the State of Lithuania, declaring Lithuania's independence from the Soviet Union. In January 1991, when the first government led by Kazimira Prunskienė resigned due to rising prices, Šimėnas became the Prime Minister of a largely unchanged government. However, as the Soviet Army entered Vilnius and surrounded key buildings, Šimėnas disappeared. In an emergency session, Gediminas Vagnorius took over his cabinet and became the Prime Minister. Šimėnas suddenly reappeared on 14 January. He joined Vagnorius' government as the Minister of Economy on 30 May 1991 and served until the government resigned on 21 July 1992. In 1994, he joined the Lithuanian Christian Democratic Party and was elected to the Seventh Seimas in 1996. He ran unsuccessfully in the 2004 Seimas and European Parliament elections, after which he joined the private sector.

Šimėnas published several academic papers on economy and a monograph about economic reforms in Lithuania from 1990 to 1994.

References 

1950 births
Living people
Prime Ministers of Lithuania
Vilnius University alumni
People of the Singing Revolution
Members of the Seimas